Sciota imperialella is a species of snout moth in the genus Sciota. It was described by Ragonot in 1887. It is found in Greece and North Macedonia.

The wingspan is about 30 mm.

References

External links
lepiforum.de

Moths described in 1887
Phycitini
Moths of Europe